Araxos Airport  is the airport of Patras, the third-largest city in Greece. It serves as a combined civilian and military airport and is located near its namesake, the village of Araxos, Achaea. It is also known as Agamemnon Airport and primarily is used as an active air base for the Hellenic Air Force, with some civilian services to European destinations during the summer months. The airport facilities were very limited until 2007, when the construction of a new 1,477 m2 arrivals building was completed. Today the airport terminal covers a total area of 2,300 m2.

116th Combat Wing 
Araxos was established as a military airport in 1936, but construction of the runway was not completed until 1941, when it also became the site of the first radar installation in Greece.

The airport has served as the home base of the Hellenic Air Force's 116th Combat Wing (116 Πτέρυγα Μάχης) since May 1969, and of its precursor the 116th Combat Group (116 Σμηναρχία Μάχης) since April 1962. It currently comprises the 336th Bomber Squadron and 335th Squadron. The main aircraft used by both squadrons is F-16 Block 52+ Advanced.

Airlines and destinations
The following airlines operate regular scheduled and charter flights at Patras Araxos Airport:

Statistics

Ground transport
Araxos airport is located 45 km west of the city of Patras and 65 km north of Pyrgos. There are bus services from Patras to Araxos. There is no train connection.

See also
Transport in Greece
Kalogria beach

References

External links
 official page
 

Airports in Greece
Hellenic Air Force bases
Buildings and structures in Achaea
Transport infrastructure in Western Greece